Spirit Riding Free is a computer-animated series, produced by DreamWorks Animation Television and distributed by Netflix, based on the 2002 Oscar-nominated traditionally animated film, Spirit: Stallion of the Cimarron, and the first series in the Spirit franchise. The series was first released on Netflix on May 5, 2017.

A feature film based on the series, titled Spirit Untamed, was released on June 4, 2021.

Plot 
Set in the small frontier town of Miradero, a 12-year-old girl named Fortuna "Lucky" Esperanza Navarro Prescott, who had recently relocated from the city, encounters a wild kiger mustang named Spirit Jr., the son of Spirit and Rain from the 2002 movie Spirit: Stallion of the Cimarron. When Lucky is on the train travelling to Miradero. The horse is caught by wranglers and brought to Miradero to be “broken in”. Lucky immediately bonds with the stallion and frees him from his pen. Lucky also makes friends with Prudence "Pru" Granger and Abigail Stone. Pru owns a talented and proud palomino horse called Chica Linda, and Abigail owns a friendly and goofy pinto horse called Boomerang. The three girls call themselves the PALs and go on many adventures with their horses.

Cast 

 Amber Frank as Fortuna "Lucky" Prescott. She is a very brave, kind, and headstrong girl, and does not like rules. She is the main protagonist.
 Sydney Park as Prudence "Pru" Granger. She is often the brains of the team, knowing something about everything. She is also brave and nice at heart.
 Bailey Gambertoglio as Abigail Stone. She is the least rebellious, and is often portrayed as sweet and funny. But she can still be smart and is courageous like her friends.
 Darcy Rose Byrnes as Maricela Gutierrez. She is the spoiled daughter of the mayor of Miradero. Initially an adversary of Lucky and the others, she eventually becomes their friend.
 Victor Garber as James Prescott Sr. (1st Voice)
 Nolan North as James "Jim" Prescott Jr., and his father James Prescott Sr. (2nd Voice)
 Kari Wahlgren as Lucky's aunt Cora Prescott and Polly Prescott.
 Duncan Joiner as Snips, Abigail's little brother.
 Tyler Nathan as Daniel Granger, Pru's middle brother.
 Jeff Bennett as Mesteneros/Various 
 Andy Pessoa as Turo. The teenage craftsman of Miradero who is the largest student in his class and is extremely friendly.
 Tiya Sircar as Kathryn "Kate" Flores-Prescott. The schoolmarm of Miradero who later becomes Lucky's stepmother and Polly's mother which made her resign from her job as a teacher.
 Jonathan Craig Williams as Al Granger
 Dawnn Lewis as Fannie Granger
 Lucas Grabeel as Julian Prescott. Lucky's charismatic cousin who tries to collect big bucks with his schemes and lies his way out whenever he gets into trouble.
 Andy Aragon as Javier. He is also Lucky's crush and later boyfriend.
 Bridger Zadina as Mixtli. A Native American who healed Spirit from his cactus injuries which made him an ally of the PALs.
 Eric Lopez as Fito
 Marite Mantilla as Estrella
 Lilimar Hernandez as Solana
 Tony Hale as Bellhop
 Carlos Alazraqui as Pablo and Rusty
 Julie Brown as Mrs. Hungerford
 James Patrick Stuart as Harlan Grayson
 Katey Sagal as Jane "Butch" LePray
 Thomas Lennon as Rooster
 Rhys Darby as Headmaster Perkins
 Paul-Mikél Williams as Jack
 Rob Riggle as Major Schumann
 Jane Lynch as Coach Bradley

Production 
The first season premiered on May 5, 2017. The final eighth season premiered on April 5, 2019.

Crew 
The voice director for the first three episodes was Ginny McSwain. Katie McWane took over as voice director after that.

Episodes

Webisodes (2017-2019) 

A number of webisodes have been released exclusively (except for "Unstoppable Music Video") on the DreamWorks Spirit YouTube-channel during the course of the series.

Home media 

Spirit Riding Free: Season 1–4, containing all of the episodes from seasons 1–4, was released on DVD on June 5, 2018 by Universal Pictures Home Entertainment. On September 24, 2019, Universal released Spirit Riding Free: Season 5–8, containing all of the episodes from seasons 5–8 on DVD. The series is also scheduled for DVD releases in the UK, France, Italy, and Germany. Spirit Riding Free: Spirit Of Christmas was released on DVD on November 11, 2021.

Film adaptation and web-series

On October 7, 2019, DreamWorks Animation announced that a feature film based on the series was in development scheduled for a theatrical release on May 14, 2021. It was produced by DreamWorks Animation and released by Universal Pictures. The film was directed by Elaine Bogan and co-directed by Ennio Torresan Jr. in their feature directorial debuts, and written by the developer of the series, Aury Wallington, and produced by Karen Foster. The film was produced on a lower budget and made by a different animation studio outside of DreamWorks, similar to Captain Underpants: The First Epic Movie. On November 10, 2020, the film's title was announced as Spirit Untamed, with a new release date of June 4, 2021.

Spirit & Friends (2022) 
On February 9, 2022, DreamWorks has announced a new series Spirit & Friends inspired by the characters from Spirit Riding Free, which taking place in setting of Spirit Untamed and was released on YouTube on February 12.

Video game 
On December 4, 2019, Dreamworks Animation released a game for Android and iOS based around the series entitled Spirit Trick Challenge.

Reception
The series was received positively. Emily Ashby of Common Sense Media described the series as "sweet," arguing that the series treads lightly on "factual strife between new settlers and the indigenous population," and said the series "raises issues, such as migration and assimilation" while saying that Lucky was a heroine who showed "courage, selflessness, and a tireless sense of adventure." Ashby further argued that the series has stories that are "humorous and heartwarming" and themes which reflect the "changing atmosphere of the 19th century American West." Dave Trumbore of Collider, said that the series is less about social commentary and more about a girl, her horse, and "real, complicated friendships and life lessons learned in a refreshingly sincere manner." Trumbore added that the series tames the message from the 2002 film, noted that in the early seasons of the series mainly focus on the "class divide," offering a sense of adventure rather than social commentary, and noted that while the animation is uneven, it is "an adventurous, kid-friendly series."

Ashby of Common Sense Media called the "Riding Academy" seasons of the series "geared toward tweens" and praised the series for having a "diverse group of characters," female characters who are self-confident, and characters "coping with challenges of growing up." Ashby noted these seasons show "healthy self-awareness and emotional maturity for tween viewers," argued that unlike the "Spirit Riding Free" seasons doesn't "touch on themes of the historical time." Armaan Babu of Meaww called the series "one of the most wholesome and inspiring shows on Netflix," arguing that while it is aimed at one young girls, it is written well enough to connect with those of all ages, with the protagonists growing "into mature and responsible young adults." Babu also noted that part 2 of the series dealt with heavier topics than part 1, and praised the series for being filled with characters who are "constantly, and genuinely supportive of each other."

Mandie Caroll of Common Sense Media called the two "Pony Tales" seasons "fun" and noted that while the series does not substantially confront "the actual history of westward settlement," it does focus on cheating, conflicts within friendships, and doing what's right. She also said that while these collections are a bit disorganized, the seasons have the same storytelling and visual quality of the original series.

Emily Ashby of Common Sense Media reviewed the "Spirit Riding Free: Spirit of Christmas" special, calling it a "so-so holiday horse tale warms with timely themes." While criticizing the film for "relegating the animals to mere afterthoughts" she said that the special is emotionally-laden and emphasizes themes perfect for a focus on Christmas. John Serba of Decider concurred, saying that he didn't understand the positive message trying to be sent, he thought it may have a "positive message for its target demographic."

Emily Ashby reviewed the "Spirit Riding Free: Ride Along Adventure" special for Common Sense Media, describing it as "lengthy story tangents" that result in a "laborious interactive story." She criticized the special for becoming an "exercise in guessing which choice might lead to the exit most quickly," but noted that involves much "realistic" peril for the young protagonists.

Notes

References

External links 
  at Netflix
  at DreamWorks TV
 

2010s American animated television series
2020s American animated television series
2017 American television series debuts
2020 American television series endings
American children's animated adventure television series
American computer-animated television series
American sequel television series
Animated television series about children
Animated television series about horses
Animated television shows based on films
Netflix children's programming
English-language Netflix original programming
Spirit: Stallion of the Cimarron
Television series by DreamWorks Animation
Television series by Universal Television